Oregon Highway 54 may refer to:

For the former OR 54, see Oregon Route 54.
For the unsigned Highway 54, see Umatilla-Stanfield Highway.
For the former unsigned Highway 54, see Boardman-Stanfield Highway.